Jeff Tarango was the defending champion, but lost in the first round this year.

Stefano Pescosolido won the tournament, beating Amos Mansdorf in the final, 7–6(7–5), 7–5.

Seeds

Draw

Finals

Top half

Bottom half

References

 Main draw

Singles